Matthew Stanley (born 15 January 1992) is a New Zealand swimmer. His home town is Matamata. At the 2012 Summer Olympics he competed in the men's 400 metre freestyle, finishing in 15th place in the heats, failing to reach the final.

At the 2012 World Short Course Swimming Championships Stanley finished fourth in the 400 m freestyle but the third-placed finisher, Mads Glæsner, was subsequently disqualified after a doping infringement and Stanley was promoted to the bronze medal position.

References

External links
 
 
 
 
 
 

1992 births
Living people
Olympic swimmers of New Zealand
Swimmers at the 2012 Summer Olympics
New Zealand male freestyle swimmers
Swimmers at the 2010 Summer Youth Olympics
Medalists at the FINA World Swimming Championships (25 m)
People from Matamata
Swimmers at the 2016 Summer Olympics
Universiade medalists in swimming
Universiade bronze medalists for New Zealand
Medalists at the 2011 Summer Universiade
Swimmers at the 2014 Commonwealth Games
Swimmers at the 2018 Commonwealth Games
Commonwealth Games competitors for New Zealand
Sportspeople from Waikato
21st-century New Zealand people